Cerithiopsis minima is a species of sea snail, a gastropod in the family Cerithiopsidae, which is known from the Atlantic and Pacific Ocean. It was described by Brusina in 1865.

References

minima
Gastropods described in 1865